GB News is a British free-to-air television and radio channel. The channel is available on Freeview, Freesat, Sky, YouView, Virgin Media and via the internet. Since 4 January 2022, an audio simulcast of the station is available on DAB+ radio.

Announced in September 2020 and launched in June 2021 from studios at Paddington Basin, London, the channel became Britain's first television news start-up for more than 30 years, since the launch of Sky News in 1989. It was set up with the aim of broadcasting "original news, opinion and debate", with a mix of news coverage and opinion-based content. GB News is described as right-leaning on political issues.

GB News is owned by All Perspectives Ltd, which is a holding company, headquartered in London. , All Perspectives Ltd is controlled by three significant shareholders, all of whom work for Christopher Chandler's Dubai-based investment firm Legatum. The CEO of GB News is Angelos Frangopoulos, who formerly ran Sky News Australia.

The channel's first chairman was Andrew Neil, who left the BBC in 2020 to set up GB News and present a prime-time evening programme. However, he presented only nine shows and resigned from his roles at the channel on 13 September 2021, three months after its official launch. Other hosts of shows on the channel include Colin Brazier, Alastair Stewart, Dan Wootton, Nigel Farage, Eamonn Holmes, Neil Oliver, Michael Portillo and Andrew Pierce. Ofcom have found the channel to have breached standards on more than one occasion regarding misinformation.

History

Foundation
All Perspectives Ltd was founded as the holding company of GB News in September 2019, and was granted a licence to broadcast by Ofcom in January 2020. GB News was founded by Andrew Cole and Mark Schneider, two executives associated with the chairman of Liberty Global, John C. Malone. By August 2022, Cole and Schneider had resigned as directors after their holdings in the company were purchased by backers Sir Paul Marshall and Legatum.

On 25 September 2020, it was announced that Andrew Neil, who had presented live political programmes on the BBC for 25 years, would leave the corporation after leading its coverage of the 2020 United States presidential election. He said that he had been in discussions to continue working on the BBC in a new format after the cancellation of his programme The Andrew Neil Show, but that these talks had "not come to fruition" and he had accepted the post of chairman of a new television news channel. On the same day, he was announced as the presenter of a prime-time evening programme on the channel, due to launch early the next year. In a statement, Neil said that the channel would "champion robust, balanced debate and a range of perspectives on the issues that affect everyone in the UK, not just those living in the London area", and GB News was addressing a perceived gap in the market for "the vast number of British people who feel underserved and unheard by their media".

In December 2020, Paul Marshall, a hedge-fund manager, was in talks to invest £10 million into GB News. On 6 January 2021, GB News reached its £60 million fundraising aim, which it said was oversubscribed. The majority of the £60 million came from the Dubai-based investment firm Legatum, Marshall, who said he was investing in a personal capacity, and American multinational Discovery, Inc., whose stake in the company was bought out by the other backers in August 2022 as part of an additional capital injection of £60 million.

Prior to its launch, GB News said it would recruit 140 staff, including 120 journalists, and would also launch "streaming, video-on-demand and audio services". Since then, CEO Angelos Frangopoulos reported that the channel had employed over 200 journalists.

The recruitment drive began on 25 January 2021. The first presenters and journalists announced in the recruitment drive were Dan Wootton, Colin Brazier, Darren McCaffrey, Tom Harwood, Michelle Dewberry, Inaya Folarin Iman and Alex Phillips. Following Piers Morgan's departure from Good Morning Britain on 9 March, Neil expressed interest in Morgan joining GB News instead. However, Neil later said that talks were affected by a disagreement: "he's [Morgan] got his own idea of what he is worth and we [GB News] have a slightly different idea of what he's worth". Later staff announced as joining the channel prior to its launch were Liam Halligan, Andrew Doyle, Rosie Wright, Simon McCoy, Kirsty Gallacher, Alastair Stewart, Neil Oliver, Gloria De Piero, Mercy Muroki and Isabel Webster.

For the period ending 31 May 2021 All Perspectives Ltd made a loss of £2.7 million.

Launch
GB News commenced broadcasting at 20:00 BST on 13 June 2021. Neil launched the channel by saying "We are proud to be British – the clue is in the name", and after the opening night was said to be "jubilant" that his programme had "out-rated Sky News and BBC News Channel combined".

On 20 June, Nigel Farage and Dehenna Davison joined GB News as contributors to host the Sunday morning political discussion programme The Political Correction.

Neil took a break from presenting on the channel on 24 June, less than two weeks after its launch.

It was reported by The Guardian in July that John McAndrew, director of news and programmes, formerly of Sky News and Euronews, had stood down from his role. Senior executive producer Gill Penlington, formerly of CNN, ITV and Sky News, also left the channel in early July. On 17 July it was announced that Nigel Farage, already a contributing presenter, would host Farage, a prime-time evening show, from 19 July. Later that month, Mark Dolan joined the channel. The following month, Talkradio's Patrick Christys joined to present To the Point on weekday mornings alongside Mercy Muroki. The programme replaced Brazier & Muroki.

On 10 August, the channel announced four political programmes to launch within weeks; The Briefing: AM with Tom Harwood, The Briefing: Lunchtime with Gloria De Piero, The Briefing: PM with Darren McCaffrey, and The Briefing: PMQs. The following month, political journalist Isabel Oakeshott joined to host a weekly show.

Neil was expected to have rejoined GB News in early September, but multiple news sources reported that his return had been postponed, with some speculating that this postponement might become indefinite. On 13 September he announced he was stepping down as chairman and would no longer be presenting on the channel. Later that month, on the BBC's Question Time, he said that he had become a "minority of one" on the channel's board, due to disputes over its approach to journalism. Neil was replaced as a presenter by Colin Brazier in what The Telegraph described as a "fight back by swinging to the right". Neil had been on a contract worth £4 million and included stress among the reasons for departing GB News. In November 2021, Neil called his decision to lead the channel the "single biggest mistake" of his career, adding "The mistake was that I put my face on the tin and yet I quickly discovered that I really had no say over what was going into that tin".

Post Andrew Neil era 

In October, following the launch announcement of rival TalkTV, GB News introduced half-hourly news bulletins and Sunday Express editor Mick Booker joined as editorial director.

In late 2021, it was announced that Eamonn Holmes and Isabel Webster would present a Monday to Thursday breakfast show, Breakfast with Eamonn and Isabel. Stephen Dixon and Anne Diamond would present this show Friday to Sunday. In January 2022, the channel announced it would play "God Save the Queen" at the start of live programming every day.

Camilla Tominey, Michael Portillo and Andrew Pierce were announced as new presenters in August 2022. Also, after the merger of AT&T’s WarnerMedia and Discovery Inc., the shares that Discovery had initially acquired in the channel's early days was put up for sale by new media group Warner Bros Discovery.

In early September 2022, in a shakeup of the channel's afternoon programming, it was announced that presenters Colin Brazier and Alex Phillips had left the channel. Shows removed from the schedule were The Briefing: Lunchtime with Gloria De Piero, On The Money presented by Liam Halligan, We Need To Talk About presented by Alex Phillips, The Briefing: PM with Darren McCaffrey presented by Darren McCaffrey, and Brazier presented by Colin Brazier. De Piero presented a new lunchtime show with Mark Longhurst, and Patrick Christys was moved to an afternoon slot.

The channel presented its first ever overnight coverage, following the Death of Queen Elizabeth II on 8 September 2022. In the days following the Queen's death, all regular programming was stopped and no advertisements were shown on the channel, with Alastair Stewart, Dan Wootton, Nigel Farage, Mark Longhurst and Patrick Christys presenting most of the coverage of the death of the Queen and Charles III's accession to the throne.

In September 2022, novelist and former Head of Daytime at ITV and Channel 4 Helen Warner was appointed Head of Television at GB News. Warner left the channel four months later, in January 2023.

In October 2022, it was announced that actor and comedian John Cleese would be presenting his own show on GB News in the new year.

Following the cancellation of the weekday show To the Point, in November 2022 Beverley Turner began hosting her own GB News show Bev Turner Today. She had already been a stand-in presenter on the channel.

In January 2023, GB News announced that the Conservative MP for North East Somerset and former Brexit Opportunities Minister Jacob Rees-Mogg would join the channel as a presenter. ACOBA were notified of Rees-Mogg's appointment and made clear that his role with the channel is subject to a number of conditions.

Ofcom have found the channel to have breached standards on more than one occasion regarding misinformation. During GB News' first year on air, their financial year ending May 2022, the company made a loss of £30.7 million.

Transmission

Television

The channel's office headquarters are at Riverbank House in London, and it has studios at The Point building in the Paddington Basin area of the city. Later, the channel also began to broadcast from a studio on Albert Embankment with views towards Westminster and the Houses of Parliament. GB News employs around 120 journalists.

GB News is transmitted on digital terrestrial television in standard-definition and from the Astra 2F satellite in high-definition. The transmissions are available on the Freeview, YouView, Freesat (Channel 216 HD), Sky and Virgin Media platforms. The channel is also available live on the GB News iOS and Android application. Red Bee Media has provided playout services for GB News since the channel's launch.

Radio 
Following the launch of its television channel, in July 2021, GB News announced its intention to launch a national 24-hour radio station, GB News Radio, on the Digital One digital radio multiplex. The radio station is an audio simulcast of the televised channel, rather than a separate production, and started test transmissions in December 2021. Eamonn Holmes and Isabel Webster were the first to be heard on the simulcast when their television breakfast show started on 4 January 2022.

As of December 2022, the station broadcasts to a weekly audience of 306,000, according to RAJAR.

Programming
Neil stated in January 2021 that the channel would be "a fresh approach to news in Britain, Northern Ireland and the Republic of Ireland". The channel plans to air 6,500 hours of "original news, opinion and debate" per year and it has hired 120 journalists. Neil has said that the channel would not provide rolling news, but would, in similarity with some US networks like MSNBC and Fox News, divide each day into "individual programmes, news-based programmes, built around very strong presenters". He said that it would aim to offer programming that would become "an appointment to view". CEO Angelos Frangopoulos added that it will be a "mix" of news coverage and opinion where it will be taking "a very different view on the regulatory environment" that is controlled by Ofcom. Instead of providing rolling news, the channel would be a mix of news, analysis, opinion and debate.

Five months before the channel launched, BBC News media editor Amol Rajan said GB News would be the first in the United Kingdom to be set up with an explicit political orientation. Other forecasters also said the channel would be right-leaning, and it was predicted by the Financial Times, The Guardian and City A.M. that it would be similar to Fox News. In The New York Times, Neil was quoted as saying "In terms of formatting and style, I think MSNBC and Fox are the two templates we're following". He also told the Evening Standard that Fox News was "an easy, inaccurate shorthand for what we are trying to do. In terms of format, we are like Fox, but we won't be like Fox in that they come from a hard right disinformation fake news conspiracy agenda. I have worked too long and hard to build up a journalistic reputation to consider going down that route." BBC media editor Amol Rajan said that "it is not the first channel to be set up in Britain with a strong worldview ... But GB News is the first to be set up with an explicit political leaning". Rajan also stated that "the validity of [the Fox News] comparison is limited". GB News has not explicitly indicated a political allegiance, and UK news broadcasters are required by Ofcom to maintain "due impartiality".

In a March 2021 episode of BBC Radio 4's The Media Show, Neil stated that his nightly news programme would contain segments such as "Wokewatch" and "Mediawatch". The channel's breakfast show, The Great British Breakfast, initially had three co-anchors, in a similar style to Fox News' Fox & Friends, but the format changed to two co-anchors from the second week of broadcasting. Free Speech Nation, a current affairs show hosted by Andrew Doyle, airs once a week.

Comparisons in programming, format and political leanings have also been made between GB News and Sky News Australia, itself formerly led by GB News CEO Angelos Frangopoulos.

In May 2022, former GB News staff told the New Statesman that at times they were so desperate for guests, they had resorted to "booking their own parents".

GB News also produces comedy shows such as a weekly topical comedy panel show titled Ministry of Offence, and a comedic newspaper review show Headliners.

Reception 
The channel launched to a mixed reception. Judith Woods, writing for The Telegraph two days after the channel's launch, described it as "unutterably awful; boring, repetitive and cheapskate", rating it one out of five stars. Chris Bennion of The Telegraph rated it four out of five stars, writing, "On launch night, the GB News message came through loud and clear – despite glitches." Jemima Kelly wrote for the Financial Times, "GB News is so tedious, so lacking in nuance, so whiny and frankly so low-quality, it is actually making me more sympathetic to the cause of those they deem 'woke'."

Advertiser response 
In February 2021, four months before the station began broadcasting, the pressure group Stop Funding Hate called for advertisers to boycott the station, based on what they thought it would represent.

In June 2021, following the station's launch, several brands including Vodafone, IKEA, Kopparbergs Brewery, Grolsch, Nivea, Pinterest, Specsavers and Octopus Energy paused their advertising on the channel, expressing concerns over its content. Some of these advertisements had been placed on the brands' behalf without their knowledge, by Sky Media through their advertising opt-outs during GB News's schedule. The Culture Secretary, Oliver Dowden, criticised Stop Funding Hate and what he described as "a vocal Twitter minority" for calling for the advertising boycott.

Ratings and public response 
336,000 viewers tuned in to see the launch of GB News. The launch soon became the subject of ridicule due to the perceived poor production quality of the channel and frequent technical issues. The channel also became subject to a number of pranks, including prank calls and gag names such as "GBeebies", a pun on the preschool channel CBeebies.

Viewership fell following the launch of the channel. A month after its launch, its daily viewership of just over 1 million trailed Sky News' 2.5 to 3 million viewers. Audience figures subsequently fell further, and on 14 July, audience figures dropped so low they were reported as zero by the ratings measurement board BARB at least twice on the day, attributed to regular viewers boycotting the station after one of its presenters, Guto Harri, took a knee on-air in solidarity with the England football team. GB News suspended the presenter, describing the event as an "unacceptable breach of our standards"; Harri later confirmed that he had permanently left the channel. The first episode of Nigel Farage's show on 19 July attracted an average audience of 100,000.

In August 2021, seven weeks after GB News' launch, Ian Burrell wrote in the Evening Standard: "This channel has been both lampooned and ignored, but critics need to get used to something: GB News isn't going away."

The Daily Telegraph reported that, in October 2021, "Nigel Farage remained the station's biggest draw, hauling in between 50,000 and 80,000 viewers while most of the channel's output remains firmly below 30,000." A Daily Telegraph report in December 2021 stated that Farage's nightly programme regularly gets around 150,000 viewers. In February 2022 Press Gazette published an article including statistics on the audience and social following for GB News compared with other channels. The article noted that GB News' four-week audience reach was slightly up in early January to 2.2 million, compared to a low point in November 2021.

In May 2022, figures published by Radio Joint Audience Research Limited (RAJAR) showed GB News Radio had received an average audience of 239,000 listeners in its first three months of broadcasting. RAJAR figures for the second quarter of 2022 showed the channel's listenership grew by a further 16%, to 277,000 listeners, making it the second-fastest-growing radio channel in the UK (behind the BBC World Service). Subsequently, between July and September 2022, GB News Radio's weekly audience grew by 50%, to 415,000. The Times and Press Gazette reported that it was the only news radio channel to rise during this period.

According to an annual poll of 45,000 UK consumers by the market research company Savanta, in 2022 GB News was the nation's third 'most loved' news brand, behind The Guardian and Metro, the 17th most loved media brand among baby boomers, and the 61st most loved media brand in the UK overall.

In December 2022, Press Gazette reported that GB News had beaten Sky News in primetime ratings over a 30-day period, with 57,107 viewers to Sky's 52,230. The channel remained behind Sky News for all-day viewership, but recorded a 48% increase in primetime viewers relative to the same period in 2021. The article also quoted a Christmas memo sent to staff by Frangopoulos, who said that 'In just 18 months you have worked as a team to end Sky News' undisputed 33-year reign as the most-watched commercial news channel in the United Kingdom'. Frangopoulos added that BARB figures showed the channel's fastest growing areas were 'in Red Wall regions across the north-east (+17% in Q4 so far), the north-west (+14%), and Yorkshire (+12%)'.  

The Board of Deputies of British Jews and the All-Party Parliamentary Group against Antisemitism have criticised broadcasts on GB News for what they feel to be promoting "conspiratorial antisemitism or other misinformation", particularly making note of some of Neil Oliver's broadcasts. PinkNews and The Argus reported that social media users criticised a satirical parody of the BBC Match of the Day programme, aired on the channel on 11 March 2023, as being homophobic because it included a line saying Gary Lineker must "quite like Brighton because it’s full of rainbow flags and woke people".

Ofcom investigations 

Within the channel's first year Ofcom were prompted to launch five separate investigations into its broadcasts. 
 more than 2,300 complaints about GB News programmes have been lodged with Ofcom since its launch.

Ofcom received 373 complaints relating to a monologue made on the opening night's edition of Tonight Live with Dan Wootton in which Wootton argued against the government's extension of the COVID-19-related lockdowns in the UK. Ofcom decided not to pursue any of the complaints, a spokesperson saying, "Our rules allow for rigorous debate around the response to coronavirus ... consistent with the right to free expression".

 Ofcom have found GB News to have breached their licence on two separate occasions, with additional investigations still pending.

Breaches of code 
On 7 November 2022, Ofcom announced its first finding against GB News, concluding that the channel breached its radio license in an episode of To The Point on 2 March 2022. Covering the Erdington by-election, GB News displayed a graphic listing all candidates as required by Rules 6.8 to 6.12 of the Code. However, the presenters did not finish reading out the whole list aloud, instead advising listeners on its radio simulcast that it was available on social media. All candidates’ names were therefore not read out in full for the channel’s audio simulcast as required by rule 6.10. Ofcom issued no sanction against the channel.

On 6 March 2023 Ofcom announced that it had found the Mark Steyn programme, aired on 21 April 2022, in breach of broadcasting rules for a materially misleading interpretation of official data about COVID-19. In February 2023, Steyn revealed on his website that his GB News programme had been cancelled and that the channel gave him an offer to which he 'had to refuse' because it would have ended his right to free-speech on air. This was after Steyn had two heart attacks which led to his programme being paused and taken over by GB News presenter Patrick Christys until the slot was finally replaced by Laurence Fox's programme.

Other investigations 
A broadcast on 4 April 2022 was looked into for a potential breach of "fairness" regulations regarding Russian war crimes in Ukraine, but was cleared. Farage's 23 August 2021 broadcast was investigated for "offensive language" but was later cleared by the regulator.

 Ofcom are currently investigating Mark Steyn for a further potential breach of standards on 4 October 2022. The investigation into Steyn's programme on 4 October 2022 relates to comments by Naomi Wolf, a figure who has previously been banned from Twitter for spreading anti-vaccine misinformation.

On-air staff 

Nana Akua
Steve N Allen
Patrick Christys
John Cleese
Ellie Costello
Martin Daubney (stand-in presenter) 
Philip Davies
Gloria De Piero
Michelle Dewberry
Anne Diamond
Stephen Dixon
Mark Dolan
Andrew Doyle
Simon Evans 
Nigel Farage
Arlene Foster
Laurence Fox
Neil Fox (stand-in presenter)
Liam Halligan
Tom Harwood
Eamonn Holmes 
Mark Longhurst
Esther McVey
Neil Oliver
Andrew Pierce
Michael Portillo
Jacob Rees-Mogg
Angela Rippon (stand-in presenter)
Calvin Robinson
Alastair Stewart
Camilla Tominey
Beverley Turner
Isabel Webster
Dan Wootton

Former on air staff

Andrew Neil
Guto Harri
Colin Brazier
Alex Phillips
Simon McCoy
Mercy Muroki
Kirsty Gallacher
Dominic Frisby
Dehenna Davison
Isabel Oakeshott
Darren Grimes
Inaya Folarin Iman
Mark Steyn

See also 
 List of news television channels
 List of television channels in the United Kingdom

References

External links
 

 
2021 establishments in the United Kingdom
24-hour television news channels in the United Kingdom
Companies based in the City of Westminster
Conservative media in the United Kingdom
Warner Bros. Discovery networks
English-language television stations in the United Kingdom
Mass media companies based in London
Television channels and stations established in 2021
Television news in the United Kingdom